is a Japanese manga series of two volumes published in 1970 by Bunkasha. Originally written by Kazumasa Hirai and illustrated by Hisashi Sakaguchi (坂口尚), the series has been readapted with a more violent and mature setting in 2007 by Yoshiaki Tabata and Yuuki Yugo. 
 This new adaptation, also known as Wolf Guy: Ōkami no Monshō, has been released as twelve volumes by Akita Shoten.

A live-action film adaptation, titled Horror of the Wolf (Ōkami no monshō) was released in 1973.

Introduction 
Akira Inugami is a new exchange student at Hakutoku Middle School, but there is another side of him that is secret. He is a werewolf.

Homeroom teacher Akiko Aoshika walking home drunk, suddenly trips and is saved by Akira Inugami who then proceeds to walk away. Ms. Aoshika sees that he is a student and pursues him only for Inugami to be jumped by his old school rivals. The gang attacks Inugami without mercy and seems to beat him to death, yet he keeps getting back up. They then hit him with a car and he appears dead. They begin to rifle through his pockets. Ms. Aoshika faints soon after witnessing it. The gang was ambushed by a large animal, which no one can seemingly make out what it is entirely. When Ms. Aoshika awakens, she finds the gang dead around her and is escorted to her school by the police only to find that Inugami is her new exchange student.

Ms. Aoshika singles him out and inspects his body physically, but finds no wounds or scars to solidify the events that happened the night before. Both are discovered by Ryuuko Konuma. Soon after being introduced to her class, his classmates start to bully him, particularly the Kuroda twins. One of them falls into a coma after he accidentally but fatally stabbed himself while trying to attack him. Dou Haguro, son to a Yakuza, returns to school after hearing about Inugami's resistance to their gang and lures him out to be beaten on top of the school's roof. He then carves the word "mutt" on his back but after they leave, Inugami's wounds are healed. Ms. Aoshika later goes to visit him, unknowingly seeing his werewolf form, and then gets attacked by a man and then an escaped lion from a nearby zoo. Inugami saves her but lets the authorities find her instead.

Inugami's pacifism against Haguro's gang starts to gain attention throughout the school, both among the students and the school staff. School President and Vice President, Shirou Kouda and Noriko Kimura, along with Ms. Aoshika urges Inugami to speak out against Haguro's gang. Inugami refuses to speak because he believes their cause is useless. Ms. Aoshika later meets reporter Jin who warns her to stay away from Inugami but she is already falling in love with her student. As revenge for the younger twin brother, Older twin Kuroda gathers gangsters under Haguro's name to kill Inugami. For this offense, Haguro severs his pinky. Having heard from a witness on television that Inugami's "mutt" wound is gone, he asks Chiba and Ryuuko to investigate.

To push Kuroda even further, Haguro kills the comatose younger twin brother with the older twin brother's knowledge and then supplies him with guns and grenades to go after Inugami. During a school conference with media, Inugami has lectures the media along with students and staff as sheep. The school is then under attack by Kuroda who open fired on everyone before Inugami kills him with his own grenade. Despite winning, he is overcome with guilt for not being able to prevent the school shooting from happening. He is later stalked by Haguro but leaves to watch as Haguro is hunted down by other assassins. Once taking care of them, Inugami scares Haguro with his werewolf form, hoping that he would stay away. Haguro sees that the wound "mutt" is longer on his back, but Chiba reported otherwise. This only caused Haguro to have an epiphany instead. Days after students returned to school, Haguro creates another mass shooting, hoping to get Inugami's attention. He then confronts Chiba who lied about Inugami's scar and violently tortured him before leaving him for dead at a hospital. Inugami, who found him, offers his blood as transfusion but Chiba did not survive. Later, he is revived by Inugami's blood and chases after Haguro. A large fiery battle ensues at Bay Bridge where Chiba had metamorphosed into a deformed monster, but Haguro eventually kills him by decapitation. After winning this battle, Haguro's ego becomes inflated and he kidnaps Ryuuko as bait to lure Inugami to him. After being tortured, Ryuuko instead diverts his attention to kidnap Ms. Aoshika whom Inugami had fallen in love with.

Inugami is later given a URL to access a webcam of Ms. Aoshika's violent rape by several men, one of them being Haguro. He becomes greatly conflicted as he tries to resist his love for his teacher, as well as his loss of power during the New Moon. Through Ms. Aoshika's coworker Tadokoro,  Inugami tracks down Haguro's residence but finds that Ms. Aoshika's rape had been uploaded on the internet. He is then lured to an empty plaza where Haguro, via webcam, asks him to transform into a werewolf or another video of Ms. Aoshika's rape will be publicized again. He becomes frustrated but manages to telepathically talk to her, both of them confessing their love for each other. He later meets Ryuuko who forces him to have sex with her; when Inugami refuses, she stabs him multiple times before offering a location to an abandoned hotel. Once there, Inugami fights against a pack of dogs, men, and heavy artillery before he reaches Ms. Aoshika. He releases her but cannot escape Haguro who has become mentally unstable and starts to consume every severed piece of Inugami's body, hoping to become just like him. Inugami lays dying and powerless before the Full Moon appears and temporarily gives him power to transform and finally kills Haguro.

The authorities later manages to save them with Jin's and Tadokoro's help but separated the two victims. Ms. Aoshika wakes up from a 3-day coma and learns that Inugami passed away. After several suicide attempts, she then requests to fly to Alaska to live with the wolves who raised Inugami. Two months later, Inugami is revived by his own immortality as a test subject but only has the memory of promising to bring Ms. Aoshika to Alaska. While in Alaska, Ms. Aoshika and her wolves could hear a distant howl and they howl back.

(Note: This plot by Tabata and Yugo differs greatly from the original novel written by Kazumasa Hirai.)

Characters 

Akira Inugami (Inugami Akira 犬神 明)
The main protagonist of the story. A Japanese-American exchange student enrolled where Akiko Aoshika works. He is constantly bullied and abused by gang members (whom he usually ends up killing or maiming). His parents were killed when he was young by hunters, mainly because of their werewolf lineage, and was raised by a pack of wolves he had befriended. He can metamorphose into a werewolf in his own will. He is quite powerful during full moons and is weak only during the days of new moons. He is shown to be quite intelligent in matters that concern him. It is said that the reason he is bullied so badly is that, as a werewolf, normal humans have a natural subconscious fear of him. However, it is also shown that the student council, who betrayed him following the shooting and caused him to leave school, are wracked with guilt over their actions following Inugami's "death". He leaves school following a shooting perpetrated by Haguro's lackey, blaming himself for the event. In the manga's closing chapter, Akira decides to stop taking the abuse of humans, seeing them all (with the exception of Akiko) as demons and beasts, and gleefully slaughters Haguro's men. He is taken to a private research center in Arizona after killing Haguro and is experimented on with apparently no hope of escape, but in the last few panels Akira breaks the bonds holding him, implying that he will eventually escape and reunite with Akiko in Alaska.

Akiko Aoshika (Aoshika Akiko 青鹿 晶子)
The female protagonist in the story. She is a homeroom teacher who met Inugami prior to his introduction in her class. She was saved from being gang-raped at the first part of the manga by Akira Inugami; much to her surprise, Inugami is later transferred to her classroom. She was a victim of rape when she was young, and was divorced from her husband. She escapes to Alaska after the final battle with Haguro and begins to live with several werewolves hiding in the wild, waiting for Akira to find her.

Dou Haguro (Haguro Dou 羽黒 獰)
He is the main antagonist in the manga. Son of the Tōmei yakuza group, Haguro is also a genius with an extremely well-built body and superhuman reflexes. Though he initially comes off as emotionless and merciless, after a confrontation with Inugami's true form (and powers), Haguro loses his mind and becomes obsessed with Inugami and his complete destruction, to the point where he can only have sex with his girlfriend while thinking about Akira or carving the word "mutt" into his flesh. Indeed, in their short "fight", Haguro was helpless and felt very humiliated, he who was since birth considered a monster by everyone he met, finally came across a "real monster" with real superpowers. He then proceed on committing several horrible acts throughout the series, including two rapes and one of the highest death tolls of the cast. He can also be seen as a very gifted individual, who despite his character and crimes, give a good representation of both the best and the worst of humanity. He even stated that fighting the werewolf with "materialistic weapons" was a stupid idea, and that what was needed was spiritual strength, henceforth a samurai sword, with which he happens to be very prominent. Haguro holds complex feelings for Akira Inugami, both an innate hatred and strange love tainted with jealousy. For him, slaying Inugami is a responsibility towards humanity (since he may very well be the only human with strength and determination to oppose Inugami and the possible wave of disaster that would come from his blood), but also a way to return to being a monster. During their final fight, Haguro devours several of Akira's fingers, gaining a fraction of his power in the process, he also realizes that he wants to eat Akira so that they may "become one", finally accepting that he loves Akira. After Akira metamorphosed into a wolf with bright white fur (apparently created by his love for Akiko), Haguro instinctively hugs Inugami but by doing that, he impales himself with his own katana, which had been rammed through Akira's abdomen. He makes a final plea for Akira to become one with him, but he dies before hearing Akira's answer and is dragged to hell by the souls of those he killed.

Akira Jin (Jin Akira)
Known as "The Villainous Wolf" in the reporting field. Like Inugami, Jin is also a werewolf and born under a bad star. Jin is often seen as the logical and sympathetic mind, especially to Ms. Aoshika. He usually appears before her either to tell her a piece of Inugami's history or personality, or to warn her to leave Inugami alone. Towards the ending of the manga when Ms. Aoshika tried to commit suicide multiple times, Jin metamorphoses into a wolf to remind her of Inugami and to continue living. Ironically, not too much is known about him because he is unwillingly to share that part of himself and no one else knows about his past.

Ryuuko Konuma (Konuma Ryuuko)
Classmate of both Akira Inugami and Dou Haguro, she is Haguro's sex mate. At the time when she was sent to investigate Inugami's scar, Ryuuko admits to being raped when she was younger because she "knows her own kind" (hinting at knowing Ms. Aoshika was also raped). She often follows Haguro's commands because she is bored, but becoming intrigued by Inugami's loner behavior, she becomes lustful for him and often daydreams about eventually having sexual intercourse with him. When Haguro betrays her and intends to torture her to lure Inugami out, she gave him Ms. Aoshika. Ryuuko becomes wrathful and envious when she finds out Inugami will only have sex with her to save Ms. Aoshika. She stabs him multiple times and fled. Ryuuko is last seen having sex with an older gentleman where she stabs him to death.

Yuusaku Chiba (Chiba Yuusaku)
Dou Haguro's right-hand man and classmate. He and his brother lost their parents at a young age and grew up in extreme poverty until Haguro's father takes them after seeing their skills in mixed martial arts. Chiba admits to being very afraid of Haguro, comparing him to a lion after he witnessed him beating a professional boxer. Since then, he has been loyal to Haguro and his father. Chiba normally does not directly initiate or participate in physical altercations which would taint his reputation as a professional since he longs for a career in it. When Inugami refuses to fight him, Chiba admits that he is the second person to make him recognize his own weakness and quits boxing. Chiba suffered tremendously when he lied to Haguro that Inugami still bore the "mutt" scar. He was beatened: his body crushed, his tongue bitten off, and was raped to death by an emotionally-driven Haguro. Through Inugami's blood, he was revived and sought revenge against Haguro. A fiery battle ensued where he metamorphosed into a hideous monster and he was eventually decapitated by Haguro.

Kuroda Twins
Haguro's lackeys. The Kuroda twins suffer from inborn phimosis, which does not allow either of them to masturbate. When found out, the twins refuse to cower and instead targeted the girl who made fun of them the most and the boy who bullied them by cutting off their noses. When Inugami enters their class, the younger Kuroda twin threw the knife at the board as a form of hostile intent. When this was ineffective, he tries to stab Inugami and instead stabbed himself. This angered the older Kuroda twin who tried in several occasions to embarrass and humiliate Inugami but was overpowered each time. When he tried to use Haguro's name to draw support out to defeat Inugami, Chiba intercepts and the support dispersed. Kuroda is punished by having his finger crushed and then severed by Haguro. The older Kuroda twin finally succeeds in being able to masturbate when his anger explodes at Ryuuko for laughing at his suffering. With confidence, he heads to the hospital to tell his younger twin brother only to find that his brother died. He did not know that Haguro was the one who killed him. Haguro gives him a mass selection of weapons, which Kuroda heads to the school during a media presence event and starts a mass school shooting. He was killed by his own grenade when Inugami threw it back at him.

References

 
 

1970 manga
1973 films
1975 films
1992 anime OVAs
Kazumasa Hirai (author)
Seinen manga
Akita Shoten manga
Werewolf comics